Zaqatala may refer to:
Zaqatala Rayon, a political subdivision in Azerbaijan
Zaqatala (city), the principal city in the rayon